Vinyl fetishism may refer to one of the following:
Latex and PVC fetishism
Record collecting